Prairie du Chien is a town in Crawford County, Wisconsin, United States. The population was 1,076 at the 2000 census. The City of Prairie du Chien is located partially within the town. The unincorporated community of White Corners is also located in the town.

Geography
The total area is 7.62% water.

Demographics
At the 2000 census, there were 1,076 people, 434 households and 311 families residing in the town. The racial make-up of the town was 98.42% White, 0.00% Black or African American, 0.28% Native American, 0.84% Asian, 0.00% Pacific Islander, 0.19% from other races and 0.28% from two or more races. 0.28% of the population were Hispanic or Latino of any race.

There were 434 households, of which 30.4% had children under the age of 18 living with them, 58.3% were married couples living together, 9.4% had a female householder with no husband present, and 28.3% were non-families. 24.4% of all households were made up of individuals and 8.3% had someone living alone who was 65 years of age or older. The average household size was 2.48 and the average family size was 2.93.

26.3% of the population were under the age of 18, 6.5% from 18 to 24, 25.6% from 25 to 44, 27.8% from 45 to 64,and 13.8% were 65 years of age or older. The median age was 39 years. For every 100 females, there were 108.1 males. For every 100 females age 18 and over, there were 97.8 males.

The median household income was $34,327 and the median family income was $41,691. Males had a median income of $30,625 vand females $19,464. The per capita income was $19,762. 9.4% of the population and 8.4% of families were below the poverty line. 12.5% of those under the age of 18 and 7.3% of those 65 and older were living below the poverty line.

References

Towns in Crawford County, Wisconsin
Towns in Wisconsin